Donald Newton Van Zant (born June 11, 1952) is an American rock singer, songwriter, and guitarist. He is best known for being a member of the band 38 Special, from its formation in 1974 until 2013. He is the middle of three sons; his older brother Ronnie was the original lead singer for Lynyrd Skynyrd who died in a 1977 plane crash in Mississippi, and his younger brother Johnny has been the lead singer for Lynyrd Skynyrd since 1987. Donnie and Johnny Van Zant also had performed together as the group Van Zant.

According to a posting in March 2013 on the 38 Special website, "Donnie Van Zant has not been able to join the band's performances for the past six months. In accordance with his doctor's strict orders and due to health issues related to inner-ear nerve damage, he will not be able to join 38 Special onstage in the foreseeable future. Donnie will continue to write and record with the band." However, it was announced later in 2013 that he had officially left 38 Special, and was retiring.

References

External links
 38 Special Website
 The Van Zants – Brothers Johnny & Donnie

1952 births
38 Special (band) members
American rock singers
Living people
Musicians from Jacksonville, Florida
Van Zant (band) members
Singers from Florida
American people of Dutch descent
20th-century American singers
21st-century American singers
20th-century American male singers
21st-century American male singers